The 2001 Texas A&M Aggies football team completed the season with an 8–4 record.  The Aggies had a regular season Big 12 record of 4–4.

Schedule

Roster

Game summaries

McNeese State

Wyoming

Oklahoma State

Notre Dame

Baylor

Colorado

Kansas State

Iowa State

Texas Tech

Oklahoma

Texas

Texas Christian

References

Texas AandM
Texas A&M Aggies football seasons
Houston Bowl champion seasons
Texas AandM Aggies football